The Permanent Mission of Mexico to the United Nations and other International Organizations based in Switzerland is a diplomatic mission of Mexico to the United Nations, and other international organizations, based in Geneva.

Location 
The Permanent Mission is located on the fifth floor of 15 Chemin Louis-Dunant. Other missions to the United Nations in Geneva located in the building include those of Lithuania, Namibia, Ecuador and Brazil.

Role 
Similar to its Mission in New York, the Mission in Geneva has similar functions, including:
 Collaborating in the formulation of strategies that govern Mexico's actions before the United Nations and its subsidiary bodies
 Participating in all meeting convened by United Nations bodies, as well as specialized agencies, keeping in mind Mexican national interests
This includes negotiating international treaties and agreements that are of interest to Mexico
 Carrying out necessary actions to promote the initiatives of Mexico before the United Nations and it subsidiary bodies, as well as other international organizations
 Promoting candidacies that are of interest to Mexico within the framework of the United Nations
 Participating in the mechanisms of establishing quotas, as well as allocation of the budget of the United Nations
 Accrediting the actions of Mexican delegates participating in United Nations meetings

Organizations represented 
The Permanent Mission represents Mexico, and its interests, in the following organizations: 
 Economic affairs:
 United Nations Conference on Trade and Development
 International Trade Center
 World Economic Forum 
 Universal Postal Union
 Financial affairs:
 Geneva Group
 Migratory and humanitarian affairs:
 International Organization for Migration
 Office of the United Nations High Commissioner for Refugees
 International Committee of the Red Cross
 Human rights:
 Office of the United Nations High Commissioner for Human Rights
 Disarmament:
 Conference on Disarmament
 Disaster relief:
 United Nations Office for the Coordination of Humanitarian Affairs 
 International Federation of the Red Cross 
 United Nations International Strategy for Disaster Reduction
 Global Fund for Disaster Reduction and Recovery
 The environment:
 World Meteorological Organization
 Geneva Environment Network
 Intergovernmental Panel on Climate Change
 Group on Earth Observations
 Intellectual property:
 World Intellectual Property Organization
 International Union for the Protection of New Varieties of Plants
 Telecommunications:
 International Telecommunication Union
 Health:
 World Health Organization
 Joint United Nations Program on HIV/AIDS
 The Global Fund to Fight AIDS, Tuberculosis and Malaria
 Work:
 International Labour Organization

Permanent Representatives of Mexico to the United Nations in Geneva 
Below is a list of the permanent representatives of Mexico at the United Nations in Geneva since its creation:

 Under President Miguel Alemán Valdés
 1950 – 1953: Pedro de Alba Pérez
 Under President Adolfo Ruiz Cortines
 1952 – 1953: Pedro de Alba Pérez
 1953 – 1953: Octavio Irineo Paz y Lozano
 1953 – 1957: Emilio Calderón Puig
 1957 – 1958: Pedro de Alba Pérez
 Under President Adolfo López Mateos
 1958 – 1961: Pedro de Alba Pérez
 1961 – 1964: Emilio Calderón Puig
 Under President Gustavo Díaz Ordaz
 1964 – 1966: Antonio Gómez Robledo
 1966 – 1969: Ernesto de Santiago López
 1969 – 1970: Juan Gallardo Moreno
 Under President Luis Echeverría
 1970 – 1971: Juan Gallardo Moreno
 1971 – 1976: Jorge Castañeda y Álvarez de la Rosa
 Under President José López Portillo
 1976 – 1977: Manuel Armendáriz Etchegaray
 1977 – 1978: Antonio González de León Quintanilla
 1978 – 1979: Roberto Martínez Le Clainche
 1979 – 1982: Plácido García Reynoso
 Under President Miguel de la Madrid
 1982 – 1983: Andrés Rozental Gutman
 1983 – 1988: Manuel Tello Macías
 Under President Carlos Salinas de Gortari
 1988 – 1989: Manuel Tello Macías
 1989 – 1994: Miguel Marín Bosch
 Under President Ernesto Zedillo
 1994 – 1995: Miguel Marín Bosch
 1995 – 2000: Eusebio Antonio de Icaza González
 Under President Vicente Fox
 2000 – 2001: Eusebio Antonio de Icaza González
 2001 – 2004: Gustavo Albín Santos
 2004 – 2006: Luis Alfonso de Alba Góngora
 Under President Felipe Calderón
 2006 – 2009: Luis Alfonso de Alba Góngora
 2009 – 2012: Juan José Gómez Camacho
 Under President Enrique Peña Nieto
 2012 – 2013: Juan José Gómez Camacho
 2013 – 2017: Jorge Lomónaco Tonda
 Under President Andrés Manuel López Obrador
 2017 – Present: María del Socorro Flores Liera

Other Mexican representation in the United Nations system 
To the UN offices:
 Permanent Representative of Mexico to the United Nations in New York
 Permanent Representative of Mexico to the United Nations Office and International Organizations in Vienna (assumed by its Austrian Embassy)
To the other United Nations organs:
 Permanent Mission of Mexico to the International Civil Aviation Organization
 Permanent Mission of Mexico to the United Nations Offices in Rome 
 Permanent Mission of Mexico to the United Nations Educational, Scientific and Cultural Organization

References

External links 
 Official website

United Nations in Geneva
Permanent Representatives of Mexico to the United Nations
Diplomatic missions of Mexico
Mexico and the United Nations